Ayesha Bakhsh  (عائشہ بخش) (born 4 July 1981) is a Pakistani television news anchor and journalist. She is known for her work on Pakistan's TV news channel Geo News.

Early life
Ayesha Bakhsh was born in Pakpattan District, Punjab, Pakistan. She is the daughter of Mian Mohammad Bakhsh and Rubina Bakhsh. She has three siblings: two brothers, Zeeshan Bakhsh (a journalist associated with Dawn News Lahore) and Osman Bakhsh, and a sister, Saima Bakhsh. Bakhsh received schooling at St. Mary Convent School, Sahiwal. She later studied at Fatima Jinnah Women University, Rawalpindi, and earned a master's degree in Communication Sciences.

Personal life
Bakhsh was married in February 2012 to Adnan Amin.

Career
Before working for Geo News, Bakhsh worked as an anchor on Ary News. Later, in January 2007, Ayesha joined Geo Television and is currently Pakistan's Geo TV's Senior Newscaster. Her first appearance on television as an anchor was on Geo’s programme, Nazim Hazir Ho. She also hosted Crisis Cell, Aaj Kamran Khan Kay Saath, and Laakin during the absence of their permanent hosts. As of 2015, she hosts the talk show News Room and she also hosted a new talkshow Report Card on Geo News. At present, she is working on GNN (news channel).

She was part of a 12-member delegation of journalists from the mainstream media in Pakistan which visited Beijing, China, on 4 July 2011.

Awards 
In 2012 and 2014, she won the Best Newscaster (Female) at the 3rd and 4th Pakistan Media Awards. She was awarded for "Best Current Affairs News-Anchor (Female)" in 2016 and people's choice award in 2017 by Agahi Awards at an event held at Pakistan National Council of Arts.

References

External links 
 

Geo News newsreaders and journalists
Living people
Punjabi people
Pakistani television talk show hosts
1981 births
Pakistani women journalists
Women television journalists